Sheffey is a surname. Notable people with the surname include:

Daniel Sheffey (1770–1830), American politician
Hugh White Sheffey (1815–1889), American politician, lawyer, and judge
Jeremy Sheffey (born 1984), American football player
Robert Sheffey (1820–1902), American Methodist preacher